The 2013-14 season saw Glasgow Warriors compete in the competitions: the RaboDirect Pro12 and the European Champions Cup, the Heineken Cup.

Season Overview

Glasgow Warriors hoped that this year they would improve on last season's defeat in the semi-final play-off when they finished 3rd in the Pro12 league.

Al Kellock was named as captain again for the eighth season in a row.

A row over the future of the Heineken Cup overshadowed the start of the season. In fact, this was to be the last year of the Heineken Cup in its present format and it was replaced by the European Rugby Champions Cup.

Team

Coaches
 Head coach:  Gregor Townsend
 Assistant coach:  Shade Munro
 Assistant coach:  Matt Taylor
 Assistant coach:  Kenny Murray

Squad

Academy players

  Fergus Scott - Hooker
  George Hunter - Prop
  D'Arcy Rae - Prop
  Andy Redmayne - Lock
  Will Bordill - Flanker

  Ali Price - Scrum-half
  Gavin Lowe - Fly-half
  Finn Russell - Fly-half
  Jack Steele - Centre
  Rory Hughes - Wing

Player statistics
During the 2013–14 season, Glasgow have used forty six different players in competitive games. The table below shows the number of appearances and points scored by each player.

Staff movements

Coaches

Personnel In

  Kenny Murray from  Ayr RFC

Personnel Out

None

Player movements

Academy promotions

  Johnny Gray

Player transfers

In

  Kevin Bryce from  Heriot's Rugby Club
  Geoff Cross from  Edinburgh Rugby(loan)
  Carlin Isles from  Detroit Lions (NFL)
  Gabriel Ascárate from  US Carcassonne
  Folau Niua from  USA 7s
  Leone Nakarawa from  Fiji Barbarians
  Tyrone Holmes from  Petrarca Rugby
  Denford Mutamangira from  Ayr RFC
  Peter Jericevich from  Edinburgh Academicals
  Callum Reid from  Edinburgh Academicals
  Robbie Fergusson from  Ayr RFC

Out

  Graeme Morrison retired
  John Barclay to  Scarlets
  Gabriel Ascárate released
  Geoff Cross to  Edinburgh Rugby(loan ends)
  Nick Campbell to  Jersey
  Bruce Dick to  Edinburgh Rugby
  Fraser Thomson to  Melrose RFC
  Murray McConnell to   Ayr RFC
  Denford Mutamangira to  Ayr RFC
  Callum Templeton to   Ayr RFC
  James Johnstone to   Scotland 7s
  Peter Jericevich to  Edinburgh Academicals
  Callum Reid to  Edinburgh Academicals
  Robbie Fergusson to  Ayr RFC

Competitions

Pre-season and friendlies

Match 1

Aberdeen GSFP: M Crawley; E Oag, H Duthie, W Wardlaw, C Gordon; M Ryan, M Ward; S Corsar, S Bingham, M Erksine, E Nimmons, S Smith, R Cessford, G Ryan (capt), T Preece. Subs (all played): R Coates, M Cox, A Wallace, C Harvey, S Warnock, G Clow, S Ryan, G Walker, A Rennie, L Earle-Wright, P Nacamavatu, S Knudson.

Glasgow Warriors: R Ferguson; B McGuigan, M Bennett, F Russell, D. T. H. van der Merwe; S Wight (capt), A Price; G Reid, K Bryce, J Welsh, A Redmayne, J Gray, R Harley, T Holmes, A Ashe. Subs (all played): F Gillies, D Rae, D Mutamangira, E Kalman, T Ryder, J Eddie, W Bordill, R Vernon, P Jericevich, R Hughes, G Ascarate, J Steele, G Lowe.

Match 2

Harlequins: M Brown, T Williams, G Lowe, J Turner-Hall, U Monye, N Evans, D Care; J Marler, J Gray, W Collier, G Merrick, G Robson, T Guest, C Robshaw, N Easter. Replacements (all used): R Buchanan, M Lambert, P Doran-Jones, S Twomey, L Wallace, K Dickson, B Botica, M Hopper, Maurie Fa'asavalu, D Ward, T Casson, P Sackey.

Glasgow Warriors: P Murchie, T Seymour, M Bennett, G Ascarate, B McGuigan, S Wight, A Price; G Reid, P McArthur, E Kalman, J Gray, T Ryder, J Eddie, C Fusaro, R Vernon. Replacements (all used): K Bryce, J Welsh, M Low, T Swinson, W Bordill, T Holmes, H Pyrgos, F Russell, R Hughes, S Lamont.

Match 3

Chiefs: L Arscott (T James 39); F Vainikolo (M Jess 56), P Dollman, J Shoemark (S Hill 73), I Whitten; G Steenson, H Thomas (W Chudley 49); B Sturgess (B Moon 62), J Yeandle (C Whitehead 62), C Rimmer (A Brown 74), D Mumm, D Welch (T Hayes 66), B White (J Phillips 73), T Johnson (J Scaysbrook 53), D Ewers (B Moon 11-21). Replacements (not used): H Slade, W Carrick-Smith, K Horstmann, D Lewis, C Sweeney

Glasgow Warriors: P Murchie; T Seymour (G Ascarate 64), S Lamont (C Cusiter 53), A Dunbar, B McGuigan; S Wight (F Russell 62), H Pyrgos (M Bennett 62); M Low (J Yanuyanutawa 30; G Reid 62), F Brown (P MacArthur 30; F Gillies 62), J Welsh (E Kalman H/T), T Swinson, J Gray (L Nakawa 62), R Harley (J Eddie 62), T Holmes (C Fusaro H/T), R Vernon

Pro12

Glasgow Warriors had a great start to the season winning their first five matches leaving them top of the league. However the results over the winter period were inconsistent and it wasn't until the spring that the side really got going again. Matches postponed over the winter period against Edinburgh and Treviso really helped give a late charge to the line. Glasgow's victory over Edinburgh in the 1872 decider won the 1872 Cup for the fifth year in a row and they found themselves second in the league. By the end of the league season, the Warriors had comfortably secured second spot. In fact, despite the inconsistent winter period the Glasgow side finished with more wins than first-placed Leinster, with only the Irish side's knack of securing bonus points giving them a slender lead.

This was the last season that a top finish secured a home semi-final and possible home final, so Leinster were favourites in the play-offs. They played 4th place Ulster in Dublin in their semi-final whilst Glasgow Warriors had a bruising match against 3rd place Munster at a packed Scotstoun. Perhaps crucially it was the Warriors first semi-final at home. It was the Glasgow side's 9th consecutive win in the season run-in.

Both Leinster and Glasgow Warriors won through, so Leinster secured their home final as expected. 5000 of the Warrior Nation made their way to Dublin to a very tight RDS Arena only to see Leinster take charge of the match in the second half and run out 34-12 winners.

League table

Results

Round 1

Round 2

Round 3

Round 4

Round 5

Round 6

Round 7

Round 8

Round 9

Round 10

Round 11: 1872 Cup (1st Leg)

Round 12

Round 13

Round 14

Round 15

Round 16

Round 17

Round 18

Round 10 rescheduled match

This match – originally scheduled to be held during Round 10, on 20 December 2013 – was postponed due to a waterlogged pitch.

Round 19

Round 20

Round 12 rescheduled match: 1872 Cup (2nd Leg)

This match – originally scheduled to be held during Round 12, on 1 January 2014 – was postponed due to a waterlogged pitch.

Glasgow Warriors won the 1872 Cup with an aggregate score of 57 - 50.

Round 21

Round 22

Play-offs

Semi-finals

Final

Europe

Despite initial confidence over a decent European run Glasgow Warriors had a mixed European campaign in 2013-14. The first match against Toulon seemed to sum up the Warriors' European experience over the season; good in parts but not consistent enough to win out.

Unfortunately for the Warriors, aside from the opening two games in October, the European matches fell in a winter period when they suffered most from inconsistencies. Losing both matches against Cardiff Blues - a side that finished 7th in the Pro12 that year - really put paid to any hopes and the last match at home to Toulon which could have otherwise ended in a group decider fizzled out with another Toulon victory. Only wins against the Exeter Chiefs gave any solace and the Warriors finished bottom of their group.

Results

Round 1

Round 2

Round 3

Round 4

Round 5

Round 6

Table

End of Season awards

Competitive debuts this season

A player's nationality shown is taken from the nationality at the highest honour for the national side obtained; or if never capped internationally their place of birth. Senior caps take precedence over junior caps or place of birth; junior caps take precedence over place of birth. A player's nationality at debut may be different from the nationality shown. Combination sides like the British and Irish Lions or Pacific Islanders are not national sides, or nationalities.

Players in BOLD font have been capped by their senior international XV side as nationality shown.

Players in Italic font have capped either by their international 7s side; or by the international XV 'A' side as nationality shown.

Players in normal font have not been capped at senior level.

A position in parentheses indicates that the player debuted as a substitute. A player may have made a prior debut for Glasgow Warriors in a non-competitive match, 'A' match or 7s match; these matches are not listed.

Tournaments where competitive debut made:

Crosshatching indicates a jointly hosted match.

Sponsorship
 BT Sport
 Rowan Glen
 McCrea Financial Services
 Malcolm Group
 QBE Insurance

Official Kit Supplier

Macron

References

2013-14
2013–14 in Scottish rugby union
2013–14 Pro12 by team
2013–14 Heineken Cup by team